Soviet leaders and authorities officially condemned nationalism and proclaimed internationalism, including the right of nations and peoples to self-determination. The Soviet Union was supportive of self-determination and rights of many minorities and colonized peoples. However, it significantly marginalized people of certain ethnic groups designated as "enemies of the people", pushed their assimilation, and promoted chauvinistic Russian nationalistic and settler-colonialist activities in their lands in stark violation of earlier policies under Lenin. Whereas Lenin had supported and implemented policies of korenization (integration of non-Russian nationalities into the governments of their specific Soviet republics), Stalin reversed much of his predecessor's previous internationalist policies, signing off on orders to exile multiple ethnic-linguistic groups brandished as "traitors", including the Balkars, Crimean Tatars, Chechens, Ingush, Karachays, Kalmyks, Koreans, and Meskhetian Turks, who were collectively deported to Siberia or Central Asia, where they were legally designated "special settlers", meaning that they were officially second-class citizens with few rights and were confined within small perimeters. After the death of Stalin, Khrushchev criticized the deportations based on ethnicity in a secret section of his report to the 20th Congress of the Communist Party of the Soviet Union, describing them as "monstrous acts" and "rude violations of the basic Leninist principles of the nationality policy of the Soviet state." Soon thereafter, in the mid to late 1950s, most deported peoples were fully rehabilitated, having been allowed the full right of return, and their national republics were restored — except for the Koreans, Crimean Tatars, and Meskhetian Turks, who were not granted the right of return and were instead forced to stay in Central Asia. The government subsequently took a variety of measures to prevent such deported peoples from returning to their native villages, ranging from denying residence permits to people of certain ethnic groups in specific areas, referring to people by incorrect ethnonyms to minimize ties to their homeland (ex, "Tatars that formerly resided in Crimea" instead of "Crimean Tatars"), arresting protesters for requesting a return to Leninist policies with the right of return, and spreading racist propaganda demonizing ethnic minorities.

Northern and Eastern Asians

Koreans

Deportation of Koreans in the Soviet Union, originally conceived in 1926, initiated in 1930, and carried through in 1937, was the first mass transfer of an entire nationality in the Soviet Union. Almost the entire Soviet population of ethnic Koreans (171,781 persons) were forcefully moved from the Russian Far East to unpopulated areas of the Kazakh SSR and the Uzbek SSR in October 1937. Before the deportation, three articles were published in the state organ Pravda, claiming that Buddhists organized Japanese sabotage, and claiming that a list of occupations that were widely worked in by Chinese and Koreans in the Soviet Union, were agents of Japan. There is evidence that Stalin edited these articles. The justification for deportation resolution 1428-326cc was that it had been planned with the aim to "prevent the infiltration of Japanese spies to the Far East." However, no conclusive documents or other information on the matter have ever been found.

Despite the Soviet Union accusing the Koreans of being "Japanese proxies", the Soviet Union would sign a 1925 Convention with Imperial Japan, granting it "most favoured nation" status, granting the Empire extensive timber and fishing rights, and later providing the Empire with oil and coal concessions inside the Soviet Union that were expanded as late as 1939. and lasted until 1943. After the deportation to Central Asia, some two thousand Soviet Koreans (or more) remained on northern Sakhalin for the expressed purpose of working on the Soviet-Japanese concessions (ie. joint-ventures). This act completely refutes the reason/the rationale for the deportation of Koreans ("to prevent the infiltration of Japanese espionage") as well as the "Soviet xenophobia" argument ("ideological" not racial) argument of scholars such as Terry Martin. Ironically, the Soviet Koreans found themselves working alongside Japanese laborers and managers because of their government's (Stalin's) economic policies and need for hard currency (the 1925 Convention). For Chang, these events on N. Sakahlin (after the deportation order) debunk the myth that the Soviets were staunch and ideologically pure socialists. The number of Japanese laborers was typically from 700 to 1500, but sometimes more. Another irony was that a large number of the "Japanese" laborers were in fact, Koreans from Korea (northern and southern regions). Seemingly the Koreans could not catch a break from the clutches of the Japanese ("Asia for Asians, we will free you from non-Asian colonialism") nor the Soviets. Keep in mind, it was Japan's responsibility (per the 1925 Soviet-Japanese Convention)  to manage and pay the salaries of the laborers and the managers. The USSR needed only to supply the resources. Japan was to divide the earnings typically 50-50 with the USSR and to pay the USSR in cash and sometimes in gold bullion.

Historian Jon K. Chang described major Tsarist continuities in chauvinism and views on race. The USSR's policy towards Koreans demonstrated a widespread belief in primordialism—the idea that ethnic groups were permanent, ancient and unassimilable—which contributed to Soviet bureaucracy's paranoia on perceived disloyal nationalities. The writings of Lev Shternberg and Vladimir Arsenev, two of the leading ethnographers in the early Soviet Union. showed their belief in "biological" nationality, a refusal to believe linguistic assimilation or religious conversion, and tropes of "yellow peril" where Koreans were conflated with Japan and perceived as conspiring or having questionable loyalty. The leadership of the Soviet Far East had already adopted a resolution in 1923 suggesting resettling Koreans away from the border, but this initial proposal had been rejected by Moscow and did not yet culminate in the mass-scale deportation later, although a deportation of 600-800 Korean workers to Japan occurred that year. In 1928, Arsenev's report for Dalkraikom claimed that the Chinese, Japanese, and Korean workers were "predators" against Russians. Even as tsarist-era writers became less prominent in the Soviet Union, the belief in primordialism would continue through passportisation and Stalinist deportations of ethnicities, being expressed most overtly from the 1930s.

Chinese 

The Soviet regime performed mass arrests and deportations on people of Chinese descent. By the 1930s about 24,600 Chinese lived in the Russian Far East, and were targeted by Soviet policies that became increasingly repressive against diaspora nationalities, leading to deportation and exile. A major Chinese community in the Soviet Union was in Millionka in Vladivostok. In 1936 after the NKVD identified 12 Chinese who were claimed to be spies for Japan, 4,202 Chinese residents of Vladivostok were deported, and many others were arrested. The NKVD official responsible said that "As of today Big and Little 'Millionka' no longer exist". On 22 December 1937, Nikolai Yezhov ordered the NKVD to “arrest all Chinese, regardless of their citizenship, who are engaged in provocative activities or have terrorist intentions.” Over the following year, 11,198 Chinese residents in the Russian Far East were exiled to other areas of the Soviet Union, such as Kazakhstan, or deported to China.

Kalmyks
The deportations of 1943, codenamed Operation Ulussy, were the deportation of most people of the Kalmyk nationality in the Soviet Union, and Russian women married to Kalmyks, except Kalmyk women married to another nationality. The Kalmyk people had been accused of collaboration with the Nazis as a whole. The decision was made in December 1943, when NKVD agents entered the homes of Kalmyks, or registered the names of those absent for deportation later, and packed them into cargo wagons and transported them to various locations in Siberia: Altai Krai, Krasnoyarsk Krai, Omsk Oblast, and Novosibirsk Oblast. Around half of (97,000–98,000) Kalmyk people deported to Siberia died before being allowed to return home in 1957.

Under the Law of the Russian Federation of 26 April 1991 "On the Rehabilitation of Repressed Peoples" repressions against Kalmyks and other peoples were qualified as an act of genocide. Article 4 of this law provided that any propaganda impeding rehabilitation of peoples is prohibited, and persons responsible for such propaganda are subject to prosecution.

Eastern Europeans

Crimean Tatars

The forcible deportation of the Crimean Tatars from Crimea was ordered by Stalin in 1944 and constituted a form of ethnic cleansing of the region as collective punishment for alleged collaboration with the Nazi occupation regime in Taurida Subdistrict during 1942–1943. A total of more than 230,000 people were deported, mostly to the Uzbek SSR. This included the entire ethnic Crimean Tatar population, at the time about a fifth of the total population of the Crimean Peninsula, and was applied to other non-Slavs in Crimea including ethnic Greeks and Bulgarians. A large number of deportees (more than 100,000 according to a 1960s survey by Crimean Tatar activists) died from starvation or disease as a direct result of deportation. It is considered to be a case of illegal ethnic cleansing by the Russian government and genocide by Ukraine. During and after the deportation, the Soviet government dispatched spokespersons to spread anti-Tatar propaganda throughout destinations of deportation and Crimea, slandering them as bandits and depicting them as barbarians, going so far as to hold a conference dedicated to remembering the "struggle against Tatar bourgeoisie nationalists". Depicting the Crimean Tatar people as "Mongols" with no historical connection to Crimea in official state propaganda became an important aspect of attempts to legitimize the deportation of Crimean Tatars and the Slavic settler-colonialism of the peninsula. While most deported ethnic groups were allowed to return to their homelands in the 1950s, a vast majority of Crimean Tatars were forced to remain in exile under the household registration system until 1989. During that period, Slavs from Ukraine and Russia were encouraged to repopulate the peninsula and a vast majority of toponyms with Crimean Tatar names were given Slavic names in the subsequent detatarization campaign.

Cossacks

The Soviet Union enacted a campaign of decossackization to end the existence of Cossacks, a social and ethnic group in Russia. Many authors characterize decossackization as genocide of the Cossacks.

Poles
After the Polish–Soviet War theater of the Russian Civil War, Poles were often persecuted by the Soviet Union. In 1937, NKVD Order No. 00485 enacted the beginning of the Polish repressions. The order aimed at the arrest of "absolutely all Poles" and confirmed that "the Poles should be completely destroyed". Member of the NKVD Administration for the Moscow District, Aron Postel explained that although there was no word-for-word quote of "all Poles" in the actual Order, that was exactly how the letter was to be interpreted by the NKVD executioners. By official Soviet documentation, some 139,815 people were sentenced under the aegis of the anti-Polish operation of the NKVD, and condemned without judicial trial of any kind whatsoever, including 111,071 sentenced to death and executed in short order.

The Operation was only a peak in the persecution of the Poles, which spanned more than a decade. As the Soviet statistics indicate, the number of ethnic Poles in the USSR dropped by 165,000 in that period. "It is estimated that Polish losses in the Ukrainian SSR were about 30%, while in the Belorussian SSR... the Polish minority was almost completely annihilated." Historian Michael Ellman asserts that the "national operations", particularly the "Polish operation", may constitute genocide as defined by the UN convention. His opinion is shared by Simon Sebag Montefiore, who calls the Polish operation of the NKVD "a mini-genocide". Polish writer and commentator, Dr Tomasz Sommer, also refers to the operation as a genocide, along with Prof. Marek Jan Chodakiewicz among others.

After the Soviet invasion of Poland in 1939, the Soviet Union began to repress institutions of the former Polish government, although these repressions were not overtly racist the new Soviet government allowed for racial hatred. The Soviets exploited past ethnic tensions between Poles and other ethnic groups living in Poland; they incited and encouraged violence against Poles, suggesting the minorities could "rectify the wrongs they had suffered during twenty years of Polish rule". Pre-war Poland was portrayed as a capitalist state based on exploitation of the working people and ethnic minorities. Soviet publications claimed that the unfair treatment of non-Poles by the Second Polish Republic justified its dismemberment.

NKVD national operations 
Other ethnic mass deportations performed by the NKVD included the Greek Operation, German Operation, Latvian Operation, Korean Operation, Estonian Operation, and others.

NKVD Order No. 00439, also known as the “German operation of the NKVD”, commanded to arrest citizens of Germany, as well as former German citizens who assumed the Soviet citizenship, in 1937–1938. German citizens who worked at railways and defense enterprises were qualified as "penetrated agents of the German General Staff and Gestapo", ready for diversion activity "during the war period" (N.B.: the war was considered imminent).

Russian historian Andrei Savin found points largely corroborating the theory of "ethnification of Stalinism" stating that Stalin's policy shifted away from internationalism towards National Bolshevism. Savin connected 1920s persecutions of Germans in the Soviet Union to that of other nationalities such as Koreans, Poles, Latvians, Finns, Chinese, Greeks, and others. He stated that "long before Nazism came to power and the problem of a military threat emerged, the top leaders of the secret police of the USSR had already formulated the view of the German Diaspora as being a spy and sabotage base" starting as early as 1924, and focusing on the long standing Volga German minority. Locations with large diaspora populations of various nationalities were more closely watched by intelligence, preceding the national operations of the NKVD, as well as intermittent 1934-1935 persecutions. The German operation of 1937-1938 like other mass deportations of ethnicities in the USSR, had aspects of social cleansing. Savin argued it was difficult to extend this to a classification of ethnic cleansing, but the Great Terror included both "traditional" ethnic repression and elements of "class-based dogma".

Transcaucasians

Nakh peoples

Two ethnic groups that were specifically targeted for persecution in the Stalin era were the Chechens and the Ingush. Soviet media accused the two ethnic groups of having cultures which did not fit in with Soviet culture – such as accusing Chechens of being associated with "banditism" – and the authorities claimed that the Soviet Union had to intervene in order to "remake" and "reform" these cultures. In practice, this meant heavily armed punitive operations carried out against Chechen "bandits" that failed to achieve forced assimilation, culminating in an ethnic cleansing operation in 1944, which involved the arrests and deportation of over 500,000 Chechens and Ingush from the Caucasus to Central Asia and the Kazakh SSR. The deportations of the Chechens and Ingush also involved the outright massacre of thousands of people, and severe conditions placed upon the deportees – they were put in unsealed train cars, with little to no food for a four-week journey during which many died from hunger and exhaustion. Like all other deported peoples, they were subject to the special settler regime upon arrival, significantly reducing their rights and making them second-class citizens. In addition to heavy restrictions from special settler status, they were targeted with pogroms in exile; although they were rehabilitated and permitted full right of return in the 1950's, they still faced strong discrimination from being brandished as an "enemy people" and having formerly been special settlers. Famous cases of discrimination include the attempt of Lyalya Nasukhanova (the first Chechen woman pilot) to join the cosmonaut program — but was rejected every time she applied because she was a Chechen.

Meskhetian Turks 

Meskhetian Turks are a Turkic people who originally inhabited Georgia before their internal exile by the Soviet Union. During the deportation, over 90,000 Meskhetian Turks were forcibly exiled to the Uzbek Soviet Socialist Republic. Members of other ethnic groups were also deported during the operation, including Kurds and Hemshils (Armenian Muslims), bringing the total to approximately 150,000 evicted people. On 31 July 1944, the Soviet State Defense Committee decree N 6277ss stated: "... in order to defend Georgia's state border and the state border of the USSR we are preparing to relocate Turks, Kurds and Hemshils from the border strip". The Meskhetian Turks were one of the six ethnic groups from the Caucasus who were deported in 1943 and 1944 in their entirety by the Soviet secret police—the other five were the Chechens, the Ingush, the Balkars, the Karachays and the Kalmyks.

Later in 1989, anti-Meskhetian riots occurred in Soviet Uzbekistan and Kyrgyzstan. The ethnic violence ultimately led to 60,000 Meskhetian Turks fleeing from Uzbekistan for other areas of the former Soviet Union.

Armenians and Azerbaijanis

In the 1930s, Armenian refugees who survived the Armenian Genocide in the Ottoman Empire developed cultural and linguistic continuities, "Ergir", with their exiled homeland as they developed communities in the Soviet Union. This was initially allowed to develop during Lenin's korenizatsiya or local nationalities toleration. Stalin reversed this "tolerance for local nationalisms of the non-Russian Soviet nations in the late 1930s", according to Korkmaz, "He set a new political tone all over the Soviet Union that endorsed linguistic Russification, Russian chauvinism, or what David Brandenberger calls ‘Russo-centric etatism’" coinciding with purges in Soviet Armenia, involving imprisonment, executions and internal exile for perceived "bourgeois nationalism". According to migration historian Korkmaz, in the post-Stalin era, displaced Armenians "drew parallels between the two trajectories of Armenian suffering in the twentieth century: the Armenian genocide and the Stalinist purges."

In 1944-1949, Stalin further deported about 157,000 people from the South Caucasus, including Armenians and Azerbaijanis, and initiated a deportation of Azerbaijanis from Armenia from 1947-1950.

Ethnic tension between Armenians and Azerbaijanis can be traced back to the pre-Soviet Armenian–Azerbaijani War. The deportation of Azerbaijanis from Armenia ensued as an act of forced resettlement and ethnic cleansing throughout the 20th century. As a result of Armenian-Azerbaijani interethnic conflict in the beginning of the 20th century, as well as Armenian and Azerbaijani nationalists' coordinated policy of ethnic cleansing, a substantial portion of the Armenian and Azerbaijani population was driven out from the territory of both Armenia and Azerbaijan. According to the Russian census of 1897, the town Erivan had 29,006 residents: 12,523 of them were Armenians and 12,359 were Azerbaijanis. As outlined in the Brockhaus and Efron Encyclopedic Dictionary, Azerbaijanis (Tatars) made up 12,000 people (41%) of the 29,000 people in the city. However, during the systematic ethnic cleansings in the Soviet era and the systematic deportation of Armenians from Persia and the Ottoman Empire during the Armenian genocide, the capital of present-day Armenia became a largely homogenous city. According to the census of 1959, Armenians made up 96% population of the country and in 1989 more than 96,5%. Azerbaijanis then made up only 0,1% of Yerevan's population. They changed Yerevan's population in favor of the Armenians by sidelining the local Muslim population. As a result of the Nagorno-Karabakh conflict, not only were the Azerbaijanis of Yerevan driven away, but the Azerbaijani mosque in Yerevan was also demolished.

In the late 1980s and early 1990s, the First Nagorno-Karabakh War broke out between the Soviet republics of Armenia and Azerbaijan. During the war, many anti-Armenian pogroms broke out. The first was the Sumgait pogrom in which citizens attacked Armenian citizens for three days. Other anti-Armenian pogroms followed such as the Kirovabad pogrom, and Baku pogrom.

Jews

After the October Revolution, Lenin and the Bolsheviks abolished the laws which regarded the Jews as an outlawed people. Whilst the Bolsheviks were opposed to all religion, Christianity as well as Judaism, Stalin emerged as leader of the Soviet Union following a power struggle with Leon Trotsky after the death of Lenin. Stalin has been accused of resorting to antisemitism in some of his arguments against Trotsky, who was of Jewish heritage. Those who knew Stalin, such as Khrushchev, suggest that Stalin had long harboured negative sentiments toward Jews that had manifested themselves before the 1917 Revolution.

Antisemitism in the Soviet Union commenced openly as a campaign against the "rootless cosmopolitan" (a euphemism for "Jew"). In his speech entitled "On Several Reasons for the Lag in Soviet Dramaturgy" at a plenary session of the board of the Soviet Writers' Union in December 1948, Alexander Fadeyev equated the cosmopolitans with the Jews. In this campaign against the "rootless cosmopolitan", many leading Jewish writers and artists were killed. The Soviet press accused the Jews of "groveling before the West," helping "American imperialism," "slavish imitation of bourgeois culture" and "bourgeois aestheticism." Victimisation of Jews in the USSR at the hands of the Nazis was denied, Jewish scholars were removed from the sciences and emigration rights were denied to Jews. The Black Book of Soviet Jewry was a historical work written by Vasily Grossman and Ilya Ehrenburg and compiled by the Jewish Anti-Fascist Committee to document Nazi crimes in the Holocaust. Initially able to be published during the war, the book was inexplicably censored by the Soviet Union postwar. Typically, the official Soviet policy regarding the Holocaust was to present it as atrocities committed against Soviet citizens, without specifically acknowledging the genocide of the Jews.

On 12 August 1952, Stalin's antisemitism became more visible as he ordered the execution of the most prominent Yiddish authors in the Soviet Union, in an event known as the Night of the Murdered Poets. Stalin organized an antisemitic campaign, known as the "Doctors' plot" in 1953. Stalin accused predominantly Jewish doctors of plotting against the state and planned show trials, dying before the campaign continued. According to Patai and Patai, the Doctors' plot was "clearly aimed at the total liquidation of Jewish cultural life." Historian Louis Rapoport wrote on this subject, emphasizing the increasingly paranoid antisemitism of Stalin before Stalin's sudden death. Communist antisemitism under Stalin shared a common characteristic with Nazi and fascist antisemitism in its belief in "Jewish world conspiracy".

Immediately following the Six-Day War in 1967, the antisemitic conditions started causing desire to emigrate for many Soviet Jews. Soviet Jews who sought to emigrate but were refused the right were known as refuseniks. Applying for an exit visa was a step noted by the KGB, so that future career prospects, always uncertain for Soviet Jews, could be impaired. As a rule, Soviet dissidents and refuseniks were fired from their workplaces and denied employment according to their major specialty. As a result, they had to find a menial job, such as a street sweeper, or face imprisonment on charges of alleged social parasitism.

On 22 February 1981, in a speech, which lasted over 5 hours, General Secretary Leonid Brezhnev denounced antisemitism in the Soviet Union. While Stalin and Lenin had much of the same in various statements and speeches, this was the first time that a high-ranking Soviet official had done so in front of the entire Party. Brezhnev acknowledged that antisemitism existed within the Eastern Bloc and saw that many different ethnic groups whose "requirements" were not being met.

Africans

In December 1963, students from Ghana and other African countries protested on the Red Square in Moscow following the alleged murder of the Ghanaian medical student Edmund Assare-Addo. He had been courting a Russian girl prior to his body being discovered along a country road. The protesters carried placards with slogans "Moscow – center of discrimination", "Stop killing Africans!" and "Moscow, a second Alabama", while shouting in English, Russian, and French. They marched to the Spasskiye Gates of the Kremlin, where they posed for photographs and gave interviews to Western journalists.

See also
Antisemitism in Russia
Antisemitism in Ukraine
Antisemitism in the Russian Empire
Comparison of Nazism and Stalinism
Racism in Russia
Racism in Ukraine
Post-Soviet conflicts

References

 
Politics of the Soviet Union
Soviet Union
Soviet Union
Soviet Union
Soviet Union